Markland Mall is an enclosed shopping mall in Kokomo, Indiana. Opened in 1968, the mall's anchor stores are Target, Dunham's Sports, Books-A-Million, Carter's, PetSmart, Party City, Ross Dress for Less, ALDI, and Gravity Trampoline Park. In 2020 Dunham’s Sports took over the space that was occupied by Carson's. It is managed by Washington Prime Group.

History
Melvin Simon & Associates announced the development of Markland Mall in 1967. Original tenants included Sears, Danners 5 & 10, a Kroger supermarket, SupeRx drugstore, and an Ayr-Way discount store.

The Danners store became William H. Block Co. in 1974. Ayr-Way was converted to Target along with the rest of the Ayr-Way chain in 1981. In 1985, the William H. Block store was expanded, taking over a mall hallway and space vacated by Robert Hall Village. This was part of a mall expansion that included the installation of new floor tiles and skylights, as well as the extension of certain storefronts to give the hallways a "staggered" appearance. Block later became Lazarus in 1987, and then Macy's before closing.

In 2001, Old Navy was added to the mall, replacing space once occupied by a Goodyear service center. Lazarus became Macy's before closing in 2005. The movie theater, also an original tenant, closed in 2006. In 2011, the former Lazarus space became Carson's, resulting in the closure of an Elder-Beerman at the nearby Kokomo Mall (now Kokomo Town Center). Old Navy closed in 2016, with Sears and MC Sports both closing in 2017. Later in 2017, it was confirmed that the Sears store would be torn down for Aldi, Party City, PetSmart, and Ross Dress for Less. Gravity Trampoline Park replaced the MC Sports store the same year. Carson's closed in Summer 2018 along with the rest of the chain. In 2020, Dunham’s Sports took over the space that was occupied by Carson's.

References

External links
Markland Mall

Buildings and structures in Howard County, Indiana
Kokomo, Indiana
Shopping malls established in 1968
Washington Prime Group
Shopping malls in Indiana
Tourist attractions in Howard County, Indiana
1968 establishments in Indiana